Naden may refer to:

People
Brent Naden (b. 1995), Australian rugby player
Constance Naden (1858-1889), English writer
George Ratcliffe Naden (1865-1953), English political figure
James Naden (1889-1963), English cricketer
Malcolm Naden (b. 1973), Australian murder suspect
Tony Naden, British lexicographer

Places
Naden Harbour, Canada
Naden Brook, England
Naden, Iran (disambiguation), places in Iran

Other uses
Naden Band of Maritime Forces Pacific, part of the Royal Canadian Navy
Naden Boats, Canadian fishing boat line
Naden gecko, species of gecko native to Laos